FAAB may refer to:

 Female assigned at birth, a sex assignment given at birth to identify a baby's sex
 Alexander Bay Airport, South Africa (ICAO airport code: FAAB)